The Landsmannschaft der Bessarabiendeutschen ("Territorial Association of Bessarabia Germans", "Homeland Association of Bessarabia Germans") is an organization of Bessarabia German refugees expelled from their homes after World War II.

The organization is based in Stuttgart, and it was founded in 1949.

See also 
Expulsion of Germans after World War II
Federation of Expellees
Flight and expulsion of Germans (1944–1950)
Soviet occupation of Bessarabia and northern Bukovina
Bessarabia Germans

External links 
 Official website

Landsmannschaften